The Psekups is a river of southwest Russia. It flows through the Republic of Adygea and is a left tributary to the Kuban.

References

Rivers of Adygea
Rivers of Krasnodar Krai